The Callanish IV stone circle is one of many megalithic structures around the better-known (and larger) Calanais I on the west coast of the Isle of Lewis, in the Outer Hebrides (Western Isles), Scotland. It is a scheduled monument and its official name is Sron a'Chail. The site was first surveyed and recorded by RCAHMS in 1914 and again in 2009, with another survey in the 1970s by other archaeologists, but no known archaeological excavations have taken place at the stones.

Description
Callanish IV is around two miles southeast of the Callanish Stones, about 180 metres west of the unfenced B8011 road. The nearest settlement is Garynahine to its northeast.

The stone circle forms a pronounced oval measuring 13.3 by 9.5 metres. Only five stones currently stand, but there could have been as many as thirteen. The stones range in size from 2 to 2.7 metres.

In the centre is a dilapidated cairn. A small slab, 60 centimetres high, is set on edge within the cairn. To the south-east of the circle is a prehistoric quartz quarry. To the south-west is a shieling.

Scheduled Monument 
The circle and cairn is a scheduled monument. It was scheduled in 1992 and the scheduled area is irregular, the longest aspect is 410m long, north–south. It covers the cairn and an area around those in which buried evidence may survive below the peat. Though it may also be to preserve the sighting lines from the circle.

The statement of national importance says of the site:

"The monument is of national importance as a very fine field monument, a small circle with central burial cairn. The undisturbed deep peat around it gives it the potential for recovery of information regarding contemporary landuse and economy, and possibly other structural evidence. It is also of national importance as a member of the Callanish group of circles, settings and cairns ('Callanish IV'). Together, this complex is one of the most remarkable Neolithic/Bronze Age site assemblages in N W Europe, and holds great potential for further studies into the date, nature and purpose of megalithic stone circles and settings."

Images

References

Archaeological sites in the Outer Hebrides
Isle of Lewis
Scheduled monuments in Scotland
Stone circles in Na h-Eileanan Siar